WFFY (98.5 FM) is a radio station licensed to San Carlos Park, Florida, and broadcasting to the Fort Myers, Florida media market.

History
From 2007 to 2014, the station was known as WDEO-FM, airing Catholic-based religious programming branded as "Ave Maria Radio" under the ownership of the Ave Maria Foundation. WDEO-FM aired all Notre Dame Fighting Irish football games in the 2008 season using the ISP Sports feed.

On September 4, 2014, it was announced that Educational Media Foundation (EMF) would purchase WDEO-FM for $2.2 million and convert the station to its contemporary Christian music network, K-Love. The call sign was changed to WLVO.

On June 24, 2015, Classical South Florida announced the sale of its three south Florida classical stations, including WNPS (88.7 FM) in Fort Myers, to EMF. On July 17, 2015, EMF took over operations of 88.7 and began simulcasting K-Love format on both WLVO and WNPS (renamed WDLV).

On August 13, 2015, the license was converted to commercial and EMF announced the sale of WLVO to local group Sun Broadcasting. The sale, however, was quite contentious. Competing radio groups Renda Broadcasting and Beasley Media filed a joint petition with the FCC to deny the sale. The petition was based on the fact that while Sun Broadcasting was below ownership limits in the market, it operates as one de facto group with Fort Myers Broadcasting. The two companies together share studio and staff, and Renda and Beasley argued the sale should not go through because the two companies combined own far more signals than the FCC allowed. In the interim, on August 20, 2015, WLVO switched from K-Love to the Radio Nueva Vida Spanish Christian format.

After two years of airing Radio Nueva Vida format, the FCC dismissed the petition and approved the sale. On June 12, 2017, the station changed its call sign to WKHW. On June 13, 2017, the purchase of the station by Sun Broadcasting from Educational Media Foundation was consummated, at a price of $3,045,000. The new owners immediately changed the call sign to the current WFFY. On June 15, 2017, WFFY changed its format from Spanish Christian to rhythmic contemporary, branded as "Fly 98.5".

References

External links
Official Website

FFY
Rhythmic contemporary radio stations in the United States
Radio stations established in 1996
1996 establishments in Florida